Landimore is a hamlet on the north coast of the Gower, in the City and County of Swansea, south Wales. To the north are the extensive saltmarshes of Landimore Marsh, adjoining the Loughor estuary.  Landimore Castle which is also known as Bovehill Castle is perched on a hill overlooking the village at OS grid reference SS 464993. Its ruinous remains are on private ground.

External links
Llangennith, Llanmadoc and Cheriton Community Council
Llangennith, Llanmadoc and Cheriton community/parish magazine - village, community and regional information, current affairs and history
Cadw description of locality
images of Landimore on Geograph

References

Hamlets in Swansea
Populated places on the Gower Peninsula